Veni Domine was a Christian progressive doom metal band founded in Sollentuna, Sweden in 1987. The band split up on 20 September 2014.

Veni Domine combined down-tempo melodic heavy metal, symphonic metal and doom metal with occasional touches of gothic metal. The band does not clearly fit into a specific category; according to the band, in doom metal festivals they are labeled as "power metal" and in power metal events as "doom metal".

During the early years, the band's lyrics dealt with apocalyptic themes from biblical point of view. Later, their lyrics was more about personal topics. Originally, vocalist Fredrik Ohlsson represented operatic, high-pitched vocals but has since shifted to more lower vocal range during the years. Fall Babylon Fall and Material Sanctuary are the band's significant, acclaimed albums. During the time when these albums were released, Veni Domine was well known in the metal scene. However, as their later albums took longer time to be released and gained average reviews, the band was more or less forgotten in the metal mainstream. Currently Veni Domine is a cult band of a small audience.

Members
Last-known lineup
 Fredrik Sjöholm – vocals (1987–2014), guitars (1987–1989)
 Torbjörn Weinesjö – guitars (1987–2014) (Audiovision)
 Thomas Weinesjö – drums (1987–2014) (Audiovision, ex-Saviour Machine)
 Klas Pettersson – bass (2010–2014)
 Olov Andersson – keyboards (2011–2014) (Audiovision)

Former members
 Gabriel Ingemarson – bass (1997–2006)
 Magnus Thorman – bass (1991–1997)
 Anders Olofsson – bass (1987–1989)
 Mattias Cederlund – keyboards (1997–2004)
 Mats Lidbrandt – keyboards (1994–1997, 2004–2006)

Session
 P.A. Danielsson – keyboards (1992) (ex-Tiamat)

Timeline

Discography
1992: Fall Babylon Fall (Massacre, R.E.X. Records, review: PowerMetal.de )
1994: Material Sanctuary (Thunderload, reviews: Cross Rhythms, PowerMetal.de )
1998: Spiritual Wasteland (Thunderload, review: HM Magazine)
2004: IIII: The Album of Labour (Rivel)
2006: 23:59 (MCM Music, review: PowerMetal.de )
2007: Tongues (MCM Music)
2014: Light (Massacre Records)

References

External links
 Veni Domine at Encyclopaedia Metallum

Swedish Christian metal musical groups
Swedish doom metal musical groups
Swedish progressive metal musical groups
Musical groups established in 1987